The International Grooving & Grinding Association (IGGA) is a non-profit trade association founded in 1972 that represents the industry that performs grooving and grinding of both concrete and asphalt surfaces in addition to Concrete Pavement Restoration (CPR) and Concrete Pavement Preservation (CPP) methods. CPR and CPP methods are a series of engineered techniques developed during the last 40 years to manage the rate of pavement deterioration in concrete streets, highways and airports. A non-overlay option used to repair areas of distress in concrete pavement without changing its grade, CPR restores the pavement to a condition close to or better than original and reduces the need for major and more costly repairs later. CPP/CPR addresses the cause of pavement distress, minimizing further deterioration. Covering road distress with an asphalt overlay does not correct the cause and will eventually manifest itself again, usually as a larger, more expensive problem. Asphalt overlays typically last eight to 12 years, whereas CPP and CPR last up to 30 years.

In 1995, the IGGA joined in affiliation with the American Concrete Pavement Association (ACPA) to represent its newly formed CPR Division. The IGGA/ACPA CPR Division now serves as the technical resource and industry representative in the marketing of optimized pavement surfaces, CPR and pavement preservation globally. As of 2009, the IGGA had more than 60 members.

The IGGA is made up of contractors, manufacturers, suppliers, consultants and public officials representing all facets of the industry. In addition to a diversified Board of Directors, the IGGA is served by a Communications Committee whose activities include public relations, development of marketing materials and industry promotion. The Environmental Committee is in place to research and educate the industry about key issues affecting the marketplace.

History

The grooving and grinding industry evolved from experimental applications utilizing diamond saw blades and equipment. The industry can be traced back to the late 1940s when a single diamond blade was first used on a concrete saw to groove pavement. Since then, concrete grinding, grooving and texturing have developed into a multimillion-dollar industry that is practiced globally. The IGGA was first incorporated in Lakewood, California in June 1972. Its inception was due to the efforts of Lester Kuzmick, who envisioned an organization that could advance the interest of its contractor members. In 1995, the IGGA affiliated with the American Concrete Pavement Association (ACPA) to represent its newly formed CPR Division. This division serves as a technical resource and industry representative in the marketing of grooving, grinding and CPR/CPP to Departments of Transportation, municipalities and engineers worldwide.

Awards

The IGGA has an annual awards competition. The purpose is to honor individuals and organizations for contributions made to the grooving, grinding and concrete pavement restoration industry. The awards are:

The Lester F. Kuzmick Award is the highest honor as it recognizes individuals, companies and organizations for excellence in the industry. The award is named in honor of Lester Kuzmick, a leader credited with shaping the IGGA and the industry.
The Operator of the Year ("Iron Man") award serves the purpose of recognizing those who work in the field for their leadership with special emphasis on dedication to quality.
The Government Official of the Year Award recognizes a government or public official for leadership in transportation activities with emphasis on grooving, grinding and CPR.
The Honorary Life Member Award is for those who have rendered outstanding service to the industry and the IGGA. Candidates must be retired or retiring and should have provided significant contributions to the advancement of the industry.

References

External links
 International Grooving & Grinding Association
 Free online CPR

Companies based in New York (state)
Organizations established in 1972
Grinding and lapping